Tony Vidgren is a Finnish ice hockey player who currently plays professionally for Shakhtyor Soligorsk of the Belarusian Extraleague, the top level of ice hockey in Belarus.

He began his career playing in the youth squads of TPS Turku. He has played professional hockey in Finland, Italy, Kazakhstan, and Poland. Most notably, he played for Lukko for three seasons at both the junior and senior level.

References

External links

1990 births
Living people
Kulager Petropavl players
Lukko players
KH Sanok players
Finnish ice hockey defencemen
Sportspeople from Turku